Brian Gregory Job (November 29, 1951 – August 14, 2019) was an American competition swimmer, Olympic medalist, and world record-holder.  At the 1968 Summer Olympics in Mexico City, he won the bronze medal for his third-place finish in the men's 200-meter breaststroke.  He later graduated from Harvard Business School.

As a teenager, he swam for coach George Haines' Santa Clara Swim Club, winning fourteen America Athletic Union (AAU) national titles.  He attended Stanford University, where he swam for the Stanford Cardinal swimming and diving team in National Collegiate Athletic Association (NCAA) competition.  On August 22, 1970, he set a new world record of 2:23.5 in the 200-meter breaststroke, which would stand for almost two years.  He was also a member of the U.S. relay team that won the gold medal in the 4×100-meter medley relay at the 1971 Pan American Games.  Job qualified for the 1972 Summer Olympics in Munich, but did not advance beyond the preliminary heats of the 200-meter breaststroke.

According to a 2013 account in the San Jose Mercury News, Job was homeless and living on the streets of Palo Alto, a victim of a bipolar disorder, according to Job's family. On August 14, 2019, Job was found dead in his motel room at the Glass Slipper Inn in Palo Alto.

See also
 List of Olympic medalists in swimming (men)
 List of Stanford University people
 World record progression 200 metres breaststroke

References

External links
 
  Brian Job – Olympic Games results at databaseOlympics.com

1951 births
2019 deaths
American male breaststroke swimmers
World record setters in swimming
Olympic bronze medalists for the United States in swimming
Pan American Games gold medalists for the United States
Sportspeople from Warren, Ohio
Stanford Cardinal men's swimmers
Swimmers at the 1968 Summer Olympics
Swimmers at the 1971 Pan American Games
Swimmers at the 1972 Summer Olympics
Medalists at the 1968 Summer Olympics
Pan American Games silver medalists for the United States
Pan American Games bronze medalists for the United States
Pan American Games medalists in swimming
Harvard Business School alumni
Medalists at the 1971 Pan American Games
20th-century American people
21st-century American people